Tanjung Piai (formerly Tanjong Piai) is a federal constituency in Pontian District and Johor Bahru District, Johor, Malaysia, that has been represented in the Dewan Rakyat since 2004.

The federal constituency was created in the 2003 redistribution and is mandated to return a single member to the Dewan Rakyat under the first past the post voting system.

Demographics

History

Polling districts
According to the gazette issued on 31 October 2022, the Tanjung Piai constituency has a total of 27 polling districts.

Representation history

State constituency

Current state assembly members

Local governments

Election results

Note: 1Nordin Othman was a candidate of Pan-Malaysian Islamic Front (BERJASA), who had contested under the PAS banner through the Gagasan Sejahtera pact.

References

Johor federal constituencies